Vasco Joaquim Rocha Vieira, GCTE GCC GCIH ComA (born 16 August 1939), is a retired Portuguese Army officer who was the last Governor of Macau.

Background

He is the son of João da Silva Vieira (b. Lagoa or Faro on 9 November 1913) and his wife, Maria Vieira Rocha and being the paternal grandson of André de Sousa Vieira and his wife, Teresa de Jesus da Silva.

Degrees

He is a Portuguese Administrator and a General Officer of Military Engineering of the Portuguese Army with the Course of the Army School and Licentiate in civil engineering by the Instituto Superior Técnico (Superior Technical Institute) of the University of Lisbon, and has the General and Complementary Course of the General Staff of the Army, the Superior Course of Command and Direction of the Portuguese Armed Forces and the Course of National Defense.

Career
Among many other things Vieira was a civil servant in Macau prior to his governorship, being the Chief of General Staff of the Independent Territorial Command of Macau from 1973 to 1974 and Deputy Secretary for Public Works and Communications of the Government of Macau from 1974 to 1975. He then became Director of the Arm of Engineering of the Army from 1975 to 1976, Chief of General Staff of the Army and by inherency a Member of the Conselho da Revolução (Revolutionary Council) from 1976 to 1978 being the Captain of April who lasted more in Portuguese politics, with an extensive curriculum of public service. He was also made Honorary Director of the Arm of Engineering of the Portuguese Army.

After that he was the National Military Representative at the Supreme Headquarters Allied Powers Europe of the North Atlantic Treaty Organization in Belgium from 1978 to 1981, and then a professor and subdirector at the Instituto de Altos Estudos Militares (Institute of Military High Studies) from between 1981 and 1983 to 1984 and from 1984 to 1986 respectively. He served as the Minister of the Republic to the Autonomous Region of the Azores from 1986 to 1991.

Finally, he served as the 138th Governor of Macau from 23 April 1992 to 20 December 1999 and being the last Portuguese Governor of Macau prior to the 1999 handover of the colony back to China. It became famous at the act of transition and the removal of the Portuguese flag when he put it, folded, next to his heart. Some had even bet then that it will not be this his last post.

Since the handover, Vieira is a senior member of the Portuguese Golf Association (Associação Portuguesa de Séniores de Golfe). Before the handover he also founded and is an active element at the Jorge Álvares Foundation (Fundação Jorge Álvares), named after the first Portuguese who is said to have arrived to China, Hong Kong and Macau. Another former Governor of Macau, General António Lopes dos Santos, served as president of the Jorge Álvares Foundation from 2000 until his death in 2009.

Decorations
He was granted with numerous decorations, both national and foreign, among those:
 : Grand Cross of the Order of the Tower and Sword
 : Grand Cross of the Order of Christ
 : Grand Cross of the Order of Infante D. Henrique
 : Commander of the Order of Aviz
 Medals of Distinguished Services of Gold and Silver
 Medals of Military Merit of 1st Class and 3rd Class
 Medals of Exemplary Behaviour of Gold and Silver
 : Grand Cross of the Order of the Sacred Treasure
 : Grand Cross of the Order of Rio Branco
 : Grand Officer of the Order of Leopold II
 : Commander of the National Order of Merit of 
 : Commander of the Legion of Merit

Personal life
He married in Alcântara, Lisbon, on 20 November 1976 to Maria Leonor [de Campos] de Andrada Soares de Albergaria, born in Lisbon on 18 April 1947, Licentiate in Roman Philology at the University of Lisbon and the daughter of João José Cabral Soares de Albergaria, 3rd Viscount (formerly Barons) da Torre de Moncorvo (with a Coat of arms of de Morais and Sarmento) and Representative of the Title of Viscount de Morais Sarmento, a mechanical engineer, and wife Maria Júlia Pellen de Campos de Andrada, of the Family of the former Counters of the Counts of the Realm and House, and he had three sons:
 Pedro Soares de Albergaria Rocha Vieira (b. Lisbon, 16 May 1977)
 João Soares de Albergaria Rocha Vieira (b. Lisbon, 24 June 1979)
 Filipe Soares de Albergaria Rocha Vieira (b. Lisbon, 18 September 1984), Licentiate in Law (Faculty of Law, University of Lisbon)

Further reading
 Vasco de Bettencourt de Faria Machado e Sampaio, Gente Ilustre, 1996, 1998, 2000 and 2001 (posthumously)

References

|-

Instituto Superior Técnico alumni
Governors of Macau
1939 births
Living people
Grand Officers of the Order of Leopold II
Grand Crosses of the Order of Christ (Portugal)
Grand Crosses of the Order of Prince Henry
Commanders of the Order of Aviz
Recipients of the Order of the Tower and Sword
Recipients of the Order of the Sacred Treasure
Commanders of the Ordre national du Mérite
Technical University of Lisbon alumni
People from Lagoa, Algarve
Commanders of the Legion of Merit